The Crazyflie 2.0 is a lightweight, open source flying development platform based on a nano quadcopter.

History
Crazyflie 2.0 is the second iteration of the open source Crazyflie nano quadcopter released in 2013 by Marcus Eliasson, Arnaud Taffanel, and Tobias Antonsson. The Crazyflie platform specifications are open source and available to anyone through the Bitcraze wiki and the Bitcraze GitHub repo

Features
The Crazyflie 2.0 is a palm sized quadcopter weighing 27 grams supporting wireless control over radio and Bluetooth Low Energy (LE). It has a flight time of 7 minutes and a charge time of 40. As an open source project, its code and design specifications are available to anyone and the design was created with modification in mind. It's extensible with additional boards called "decks" - similar to Arduino shields - that are connected through two rows of pin headers.

Decks

The following decks are currently available:

 LED-ring deck
 Qi wireless charging deck
 SD-card deck
 Prototyping deck
 BigQuad deck
 Breakout deck
 Buzzer deck
 Loco positioning deck
 Z-ranger deck
 Flow deck

Development
The Crazyflie firmware is written in C++  and based on FreeRTOS. On the client side several languages can be used including Python, C++, C#, Ruby, NodeJS, Scala, Java and Ada/SPARK. There are also mobile clients for iOS and Android  available.

See also
UAV
Quadcopter

References

External links
 Bitcraze on Github
Bitcraze Wiki
Official website

Unmanned aerial vehicles of the United States
Free software
Quadcopters